Richard Davies Ireland  (27 October 1815 – 11 January 1877) was an Australian politician, a member of the Victorian Legislative Assembly and Attorney-General.

Ireland was born in Galway, educated at Trinity College Dublin (B.A., 1837) and was called to the Irish bar in 1838.

Ireland emigrated to Victoria in 1852, and was called to the local bar in the following year. His brilliant and gratuitous defence of the Ballarat rioters brought him enormous popularity, and he was elected to represent Castlemaine Boroughs in the Assembly in 1857, and was appointed Solicitor-General in March 1858 in the John O'Shanassy Ministry, retiring with his colleagues in October 1859, when he was returned for Maryborough. He was appointed Queen's Counsel in 1863.

Ireland joined the Richard Heales Administration as Attorney-General in November 1860, but resigned in July 1861, four months before the fall of the Ministry. When the O'Shanassy Ministry, which succeeded, came in November, Ireland again became Attorney-General, retiring with his colleagues in June 1863, he did not again hold office. Ireland represented Villiers and Heytesbury from August 1861 until resigning in April 1864, he then represented Kilmore from February 1866 to December 1867.

Ireland died in South Yarra, Melbourne on 11 January 1877; his wife Sophia Mary, née Carr predeceased him. Sophia's sister, Selina, was married to Henry Samuel Chapman. Ireland's daughter Harriet married John F. M. Fraser (son of the Hon. Thomas Fraser), who was appointed Q.C. in New Zealand in 1910.

References

External links
 (Obituary)

1816 births
1877 deaths
Members of the Victorian Legislative Assembly
People from Galway (city)
Irish emigrants to colonial Australia
Attorneys-General of the Colony of Victoria
Solicitors-General of Victoria
Australian King's Counsel
19th-century Australian politicians